Martin Blaise Nyaboho (born 1955) is no longer  a Burundian Anglican archbishop. He was elected the fourth archbishop and Primate of the Province of the Anglican Church of Burundi, and was installed on 21 August 2016 in Bujumbura's Holy Trinity Cathedral. He was succeeded by the Rt Rev Macumi Sixbert and was installed on the 21 August 2021.

Early life and religious career
He was baptized in 1965 and confirmed in July 1969. He attended primary school at Rweza-Ryansoro Commune Gitega Province. He continued his studies at the teachers college of Kibimba. He did his religious studies at Muweya Bible Institute and Matana Theological College. He attended afterwards Kenya Highlands Bible College, now called Kenya Highlands Evangelical University, in Kericho, and Asbury University College, in Wilmore, Kentucky, United States.

Nyaboho with his B.A. in Systematic Theology was a teacher at Matana Bible College, a Christian literature translator in Scripture Union, and a Bible translator at the Bible Society.

He was consecrated the first bishop of the Diocese of Makamba in 1997. He was the delegate of the Province of the Anglican Church of Burundi at the Anglican Consultative Council, from 2005 to 2009.

He was elected the fourth Archbishop and Primate of the Anglican Church of Burundi at the House of Bishops meeting held at 21 June 2016. Nyaboho was installed as archbishop on 21 August 2016 in Bujumbura's Holy Trinity Cathedral. At the occasion, the Bishop of Durham, the Rt Revd Paul Butler, preached the sermon.

He attended the 6th Global South meeting, in Cairo, Egypt, on 3-8 October 2016. In 2018 he led a march against gender violence through Makamba.

Personal life
He is married to Emillienne and they have eight children, two boys, six girls and 4 grand children.

References

1955 births
Living people
Burundian Anglicans
20th-century Anglican bishops in Africa
21st-century Anglican bishops in Africa
21st-century Anglican archbishops
Asbury University alumni
Anglican bishops of Makamba
Anglican archbishops of Burundi